This article contains information about the literary events and publications of 1782.

Events
January 13 – Friedrich Schiller's first play, the revolutionary melodrama The Robbers (Die Räuber), causes a sensation in Mannheim at its first performance. Schiller, a military doctor at the time, is arrested for attending the performance without having permission to leave his regiment.
August 18 – William Blake marries Catherine Boucher at St Mary's Church, Battersea. In the same year, he meets his future patron, John Flaxman.
October 10 – Sarah Siddons makes a triumphant return to the Drury Lane Theatre in London, in the title role of David Garrick's adaptation of Thomas Southerne's Isabella, or, The Fatal Marriage.
unknown dates
Charles Dibdin becomes joint manager of the Royal Circus, afterwards known as the Surrey Theatre, in London.
The Siku Quanshu is completed, the largest literary compilation in China's history. The books are bound in 36,381 volumes with more than 79,000 chapters, containing about 2.3 million pages and 800 million Chinese characters.

New books

Fiction
Elizabeth Blower – George Bateman
Fanny Burney (anonymously) – Cecilia
J. Hector St. John de Crèvecœur – Letters from an American Farmer
Pierre Choderlos de Laclos – Les Liaisons dangereuses
Lady Mary Hamilton – The Life of Mrs. Justman
Johann Karl August Musäus – Volksmärchen der Deutschen (first volume)
Betje Wolff and Aagje Deken – Historie van mejuffrouw Sara Burgerhart

Drama
Vittorio Alfieri – Saul
Hannah Cowley – The Belle's Stratagem
Richard Cumberland – The Walloons
Charles Nicolas Favart – Le Diable boiteux 
Denis Fonvizin – The Minor
Jean-Pierre Claris de Florian – Le Bon Ménage
Louis-Sébastien Mercier
Le Déserteur (first performed)
La Destruction de la ligue
John O'Keeffe
The Castle of Andalusia
Harlequin Teague
The Lord Mayor's Day

Poetry

William Cowper
The Diverting History of John Gilpin
Verses Supposed to be Written by Alexander Selkirk
Poems
John Freeth – Modern Songs
Johann Wolfgang von Goethe  – "Erlkönig"
William Hayley – An Essay on Epic Poetry in Five Epistles to Mason
William Mason
An Archaeological Epistle to Jeremiah Milles....
King Stephen's Watch
Hannah More – Sacred Dramas for Young Persons
Edward Rushton – The Dismember'd Empire (attributed)
John Scott – Poetical Works
Helen Maria Williams – Edwin and Eltruda
John Wolcot as "Peter Pindar" – Lyric Odes, to the Royal Academicians

Non-fiction
Thomas Day – Reflections upon the Present State of England, and the Independence of America
William Gilpin – Observations on the River Wye, and Several Parts of South Wales
Edmond Malone – Cursory Observations on the Poems Attributed to Thomas Rowley (debunking Chatterton's hoax)
John Nichols – Biographical and Literary Anecdotes of William Bowyer
Thomas Pennant – The Journey from Chester to London
Isaac Reed – Biographia Dramatica
Joseph Ritson – Observations on the Three First Volumes of the History of English Poetry (on Thomas Warton)
Jean-Jacques Rousseau
The Confessions
Reveries of a Solitary Walker
J. Hector St. John – Letters from an American Farmer
Louis Claude de Saint-Martin – Tableau naturel des rapports qui existent entre Dieu, l'homme, et l'univers
Ignatius Sancho – Letters of the Late Ignatius Sancho, an African
Thomas Spence – The History of Crusonia on Robinson Crusoe's Island
Emanuel Swedenborg – Heaven and Hell (translated by Antoine-Joseph Pernety from Latin into French)
Thomas Tyrwhitt – A Vindication of the Appendix to the Poems, called Rowley's
Joseph Warton – An Essay on the Writings and Genius of Pope
Thomas Warton – An Enquiry into the Authenticity of the Poems Attributed to Thomas Rowley

Births
January 30 – Ann Taylor, English poet and critic (died 1866)
February – Georg Koës, Danish philologist (died 1811)
March 2 – Isaac Pocock, English dramatist and painter (died 1835)
April 16 – William Jerdan, Scottish journalist (died 1869)
June 9 – Peter Fisher, Canadian historian (died 1848)
September 7 – Susan Edmonstone Ferrier, Scottish novelist (died 1854)
September 19 – Richard Lower, English dialect poet (died 1865)
September 25 – Charles Maturin, Irish dramatist and novelist (died 1824

Uncertain dates
Alexander Jamieson, Scottish textbook writer, schoolmaster and rhetorician (died 1850)
Grace Kennedy, Scottish novelist (died 1825)
Benjamin Thorpe, English scholar of Anglo-Saxon (died 1870)

Deaths
January 1 – Juan Crespí, Majorcan explorer and diarist (born 1721)
January 21 – Giovanni Cristofano Amaduzzi, Italian philologist (born 1740)
January 29 – Johanna Charlotte Unzer, German writer (b. 1725) 
February 10 – Friedrich Christoph Oetinger, German theosopher (born 1702)
February 14 – Thomas Newton, English Biblical commentator (born 1704)
April 12 – Metastasio, Italian poet (born 1698)
July 2 – Jean-Jacques Rousseau, French philosopher (born 1712)
December 27 – Henry Home, Lord Kames, Scottish philosopher (born 1696)
unknown date – Jean-Martin de Prades, French theologian (born c. 1720)

References

 
Years of the 18th century in literature